James Stoner may refer to:

 James Reist Stoner Jr. (born 1955), professor of political science at Louisiana State University
 James A.F. Stoner (born 1935), professor of management at the Gabelli School of Business Administration of Fordham University